The Washington Bears were an all-black professional basketball team of the 1940s. 

Sponsored by movie theater owner Abe Lichtman, the Bears played their home games at Turner's Arena in Washington, DC. Most of the team was composed of former New York Renaissance players, such as Pop Gates, Tarzan Cooper, Jackie Bethards, and John Isaacs. In 1943, the Bears achieved a 41-0 record and won the World Professional Basketball Tournament, defeating the Oshkosh All-Stars in the championship game.

References

Defunct basketball teams in the United States
1940s establishments in Washington, D.C.
1940s disestablishments in Washington, D.C.
Sports clubs established in the 1940s
Basketball teams in Washington, D.C.